Lando Bartolini (born 11 April 1937 in Prato) is an Italian tenor.

He studied at the Academy of Vocal Arts in Philadelphia after winning the Mario Lanza Award in 1968. In 1973 he debuted as Osaka in Mascagni's Iris at the Gran Teatre del Liceu in Barcelona and then became a naturalized American, appearing as Turiddu in Cavalleria Rusticana at the New York City Opera.

Bartolini returned to Italy in January 1982 and featured in the La Scala di Milano in the title role of Ernani. He later sang at some of the most prestigious opera houses in Europe, in Vienna, Munich, Hamburg, Berlin, Paris, Covent Garden, London and the Arena di Verona as well as South America.

In 1986 he replaced Luciano Pavarotti in a production of Ernani at the Lyric Opera of Chicago which garnered him critical acclaim and in 1988 he made his debut with the Metropolitan Opera.

References

Italian operatic tenors
1937 births
Living people
People from Prato
Italian emigrants to the United States
Academy of Vocal Arts alumni